The men's 1 km time trial, Class B track cycling event at the 2012 Summer Paralympics took place on 1 September at London Velopark. This class is for blind and visually impaired cyclists riding with a sighted pilot.

Results
WR = world record; DNF = did not finish.

References

Men's time trial B